A macaroon is a small cake or biscuit, typically made from ground almonds (the original main ingredient), coconut or other nuts (or even potato), with sugar and sometimes flavourings (e.g. honey, vanilla, spices), food colouring, glacé cherries, jam or a chocolate coating; or a combination of these or other ingredients. Some recipes use sweetened condensed milk. Macaroons are sometimes baked on edible rice paper placed on a baking tray.

Etymology 
The name "macaroon" comes from the Italian maccarone or maccherone meaning "paste", referring to the original almond paste ingredient; this word itself derives from ammaccare, meaning "to crush".

Origins
Culinary historians write that macaroons can be traced to an Italian monastery of the 8th or 9th century. The monks came to France in 1533, joined by the pastry chefs of Catherine de' Medici, wife of King Henry II. Later, two Benedictine nuns, Sister Marguerite and Sister Marie-Elisabeth, came to Nancy seeking asylum during the French Revolution. The two women paid for their housing by baking and selling macaroons, and thus became known as the "Macaroon Sisters".

Italian Jews later adopted macaroons because it has no flour or leavening (macaroons are leavened by egg whites) and can be eaten during the eight-day observation of Passover. It was introduced to other European Jews, and became popular as a year-round sweet.

Recipes for macaroons appear in recipe books at least as early as 1725 (Robert Smith's Court Cookery, or the Complete English Cook), and use egg whites and almond paste. Mrs Beeton's Book of Household Management includes a typical traditional recipe. Over time, coconut was added to the ground almonds and, in certain recipes, replaced them. Potato starch is also sometimes included in the recipe, to give the macaroons more body.

Regional varieties

Dominican Republic
Macaroons in the Dominican Republic are very dark. Grated coconut is mixed with ginger and cinnamon.

France

There are many regional variations of French macaroon. The coconut macaroon is known as the "Congolais", or "le rocher à la noix de coco".

Germany
Mandelhörnchen (Almond crescents) are a common treat in Germany. Made of a similar flour to the macaroon's, they are formed to resemble a crescent, then covered in sliced almonds and dipped in chocolate.

India
Thoothukudi in Tamil Nadu and Mangaluru in Karnataka have their own varieties of macaroon made with cashews and egg whites, adapted from those introduced in colonial times.

Ireland
A macaroon chocolate bar is made by Wilton Candy in County Kildare. The description on the packaging is "macaroon pieces in Irish milk chocolate." It was first made in 1937. Cleeve's Irish Confectionery also make a macaroon chocolate bar, with ingredients including cocoa butter, milk powder and desiccated coconut.

Italy

Ricciarelli are a soft almond variety originating from Siena. Amaretti di Saronno are a usually crunchy variety from Saronno.

Both are often served on special occasions such as Christmas.

Philippines

Philippine coconut macaroons are uniquely cake-like in texture. They are slightly crunchy on the outside and soft, moist and chewy on the inside. They are usually baked into small, colourful cupcake wrappers and topped with a raisin. They are popular during holidays and special occasions.

Puerto Rico
In Puerto Rico, coconut macaroons are called besitos de coco (little coconut kisses).  A few variations of besitos de coco can be found on the island, the most popular ones including lemon zest and vanilla as additional ingredients.

Spain
The carajito is a macaroon variant made with hazelnuts and honey from the town of Salas, Asturias in northern Spain. A larger size version is commonly known as sultana or suspiros del moro.

Turkey
Acıbadem kurabiyesi is a traditional Turkish variety made of almonds, sugar and egg whites. The traditional recipes include a small amount of bitter almonds, which gives this macaroon its name. Because bitter almonds are not readily available, almond extract is typically used as a substitute. These are part of the stock-in trade of almost every bakery in Turkey, as they are seldom made at home.

United Kingdom
In the UK generally, the traditional almond macaroon often includes almond essence to strengthen the flavour, and is topped with an almond flake. Coconut macaroons are also popular.

Scotland
In Scotland, the Scottish macaroon has a dense, sugary centre and is covered in chocolate and roasted coconut. Traditionally they were made with cold leftovers of mashed potatoes and sugar loaf. When the macaroon bar became commercial the recipe no longer used mashed potato because of shelf life limitations. The modern macaroon is made from a combination (depending on producer) of sugar, glucose, water and egg white. These ingredients make a fondant centre. This recipe was reportedly discovered by accident in Coatbridge in 1931, when confectioner John Justice Lees was said to have botched the formula for making a chocolate fondant bar and threw coconut over it in disgust, producing the first macaroon bar.

Macaroon chocolate bars are also popular in Scotland. Buchanan's make a macaroon with Belgian chocolate and toasted coconut. They are a long-established family business based in Greenock. Scottish macaroon is made with a paste of potato and sugar.

United States

Coconut macaroons are common in America. Commercially made coconut macaroons are generally dense, moist and sweet; they are available in a few flavors, and often dipped in chocolate.  Homemade macaroons and varieties produced by smaller bakeries are commonly light and fluffy. Macaroons made with coconuts are often piped with a star shaped tip, whereas macaroons made with nuts are more likely shaped individually due to the stiffness of the dough. 

Mass produced commercial macaroons in the United States are each about half an ounce, or 14 grams, in weight. They are not a highly processed product, containing only coconut, sweetener, starch, egg whites, and flavoring (if any). At about 60-70 calories each, however, they contain about 3-4 grams of saturated fat due to the coconut, and 3-4 grams of added sugar, depending on the particular flavor. They are vegetarian (not vegan as they contain egg whites), and contain no gluten, dairy, cholesterol, or sulfites.

Due to containing no grains or leavening, macaroons are a staple snack among American Jews on Passover and come in a variety of flavors besides coconut, including chocolate, chocolate chip, vanilla and almond.

See also
Almond biscuit - similar to macaroons
Cocadas - confectionery similar to small coconut macaroons

References

External links
Besitos de Coco Recipe (span)

Cookies
Biscuits
Almond cookies
Foods containing coconut
Philippine cuisine
Scottish cuisine
Jewish cuisine
Jewish baked goods
Turkish cuisine
Dominican Republic cuisine
Puerto Rican cuisine